Clement Hodgkinson (1818 – 5 September 1893) was a notable English naturalist, explorer and surveyor of Australia. He was Victorian Assistant Commissioner of Crown Lands and Survey from 1861 to 1874.

Exploration in New South Wales 
Qualified as a civil engineer, Hodgkinson left England in 1839 intending to become a pastoralist. After his arrival, he bought into a cattle station near Kempsey, north of Sydney. A year later, the New South Wales colonial government hired Hodgkinson to survey and explore the northeastern areas of New South Wales as far as Moreton Bay. In March 1841 he explored the upper reaches of the Nambucca and Bellinger rivers, becoming in the process the first European to make contact with the local Aborigines there. He then followed the Macleay, Clarence, Hastings, Richmond and Tweed river valleys, visiting Port Macquarie, Brisbane and Moreton Bay. After returning to England, he published an account of his explorations, Australia, from Port Macquarie to Moreton Bay, in 1845. In it he included observations about the Aboriginal tribal life he had witnessed and the natural history of the areas he had explored, such as this description of rainforest:

"... the peculiar appearance of the brush is principally caused by the countless species of creepers, wild vines, and parasitical plants of singular conformation, which, interlaced and intertwined in inextricable confusion, bind and weave together the trees almost to their summits, and hang in rich and elegant flowering festoons from the highest branches. The luxuriant and vigorous character of the brush, on alluvial land, in the northern part of the territory of New South Wales, cannot be surpassed in any tropical region. When this brushland is cleared, and cultivated, its fertility seems inexhaustible ..."

Hodgkinson concluded the chapter on his encounter with the Aborigines with the following observation:

"... indeed I think that all endeavours to make them adopt more settled habits will be useless, for what great inducement does the monotonous and toilsome existence of the labouring classes in civilized communities offer, to make the savage abandon his independent and careless life, diversified by the exciting occupations of hunting, fighting, and dancing."

He described the Bellinger River valley as "contain[ing] the finest cedar and rosewood I have ever seen" and noted the fierce defence local Aboriginal tribes would put up against encroachment from timber cutters. When Hodgkinson later returned to the valley, members of the Yarrahappinni accompanied him to assure the locals that his intentions were benign.

After exploring the southwest region of Sydney, He was able to secure a foothold in the Kirkham Rise Estate, to which, after a long drawn out tender process construction of a Bazyaric home will begin.

Landscape design of Melbourne's gardens 

Hodgkinson must have appreciated his first stint exploring Australia. In the 1850s he again journeyed from England to the young colony of Victoria. In 1854 his wife, Amelia Diana Hunt, gave birth to a son. A year later his first wife was dead at the age of 26. In 1857 he married Anne Smart and they subsequently had several children, although not without the sadness of the death of a child.

In 1852, Hodgkinson joined the Survey Office as a draftsman and was appointed as District Surveyor for Victoria in 1855. As part of his surveying duties, the township of Warrandyte was laid out in 1856. In 1857-1858 he was the Surveyor General of Victoria.

St Vincent Gardens in Albert Park, now a nationally significant park, is an example of nineteenth century residential development around a landscaped square which Hodgkinson initially designed in 1857 and developed in 1864-1870.

In 1860 responsibility for the government reserves was exercised by Clement Hodgkinson, the new administrative head of the Lands Department, who took a detailed interest in the planning and development of the city parks, including Fitzroy Gardens. This started an extensive period of landscape design of Melbourne's parks and gardens including:

 Prepared a plan in 1862 for the Flagstaff gardens.
 Designed and oversaw the development of the Fitzroy Gardens.
 Queen Victoria provided the grant of land in 1865 for the Edinburgh gardens, in North Fitzroy, which were subsequently laid out by Clement Hodgkinson
 Designed the Treasury Gardens in 1867 as a pattern of diagonally crossing paths lined with trees, to emulate the Union Jack. Willow trees were planted around an ornamental pond.
 Awarded the task of designing the St Kilda recreational reserve, known today as Alma Park in 1867.
 Made minor changes to Edward La Trobe Bateman's design of the Carlton Gardens after the colonial government resumed control of the site from the Melbourne City Council. Soon afterwards, the gardens were drastically redesigned for the 1880 Melbourne International Exhibition by the Melbourne architect Joseph Reed and horticulturalist William Sangster. Areas cleared by demolition of temporary buildings from the Exhibitions (including the 1888 Centennial Exhibition), were designed by Hodgkinson, his bailiff Nicholas Bickford, and the later City of Melbourne curator of parks and gardens John Guilfoyle. The Carlton Gardens are now a listed World Heritage Site.
 Other notable parks include Princes Park in Maryborough, which was a combined effort by a trio of important landscape designers in Victoria, Clement Hodgkinson, William Guilfoyle and Hugh Linaker.

In 1873, Hodkingson accepted the position of Inspector General of Metropolitan Parks and Reserves and a year later he retired. During his retirement he landscaped the Melbourne General Cemetery and in March 1882, joined the Melbourne Public Parks and Gardens Committee.

Managing Victoria's Forests

During Hodgkinson's final years as Victorian Assistant-Commissioner of Crown Lands and Survey he established a programme of reservation, regulation, administration and education to control the use of Victoria's forests. The Central Forest Board was established to oversee the entire system on 6 March 1874, with Hodgkinson on the board. On 11 March 1874 Clement Hodgkinson retired from public service. In 1883 he briefly came out of retirement to sit on a new Committee of Management to inspect the City Gardens he had done so much to create.

Royal Society of Victoria

Hodgkinson was involved in what would become the Royal Society of Victoria, which discussed and advised the colonial government on scientific issues. One of his papers discussed at the Philosophical Institute held at the Museum of Natural History was titled On the favourable geological and chemical nature of the principal rocks and soils of Victoria, in reference to the production of ordinary cereals and wine. Other papers presented included on Hydrometry, and the Geology of the Upper Murray area. Historian Georgina Whitehead has argued that his most notable contribution as a member was to argue, along with Secretary for Mines, Robert Brough Smyth, the need to use Australian rather than European calculations of evaporation and precipitation to site Melbourne’s first reservoir, leading the government to choose Yan Yean.

Hodgkinson was Vice-President of the Philosophical Institute of Victoria in 1856 and again in 1858, and Council Member of the Royal Society of Victoria in 1859-1860.

Hodgkinson 1860 he was a member of the Royal Society's Exploration Committee which organised the Burke and Wills expedition.

Works

Tributes
Hodgkinsonia ovatiflora, commonly referred to as Hodgkinsonia or Golden ash was named after Clement Hodgkinson. The species is found from the Hastings River, NSW to Mackay, Qld. It grows in Subtropical, dry and littoral rainforest, and also open forest.

In 1858, John Hardy named Olinda creek after Alice Olinda Hodgkinson, the daughter of Clement Hodgkinson. Subsequently the suburb of Olinda was named after the creek.

References

External links
Explorer and surveyor, Clement Hodgkinson, 1818 - 1893
 Hodgkinsonia ovatiflora
Burke and Wills Web; RSV Exploration Committee
H. W. Nunn, 'Hodgkinson, Clement (1818 - 1893)', Australian Dictionary of Biography, Volume 4, MUP, 1972, pp 403–404

1818 births
1893 deaths
Explorers of Australia
Australian landscape architects
Surveyors General of Victoria
19th-century Australian public servants
English emigrants to colonial Australia